or Wielka Czantoria is a mountain on the border of Poland and the Czech Republic, in the Silesian Beskids mountain range. Parts of the mountain on both sides are designated a protected area.

Geography
The peak of Czantoria Wielka is located on the tripoint of municipal territories of Ustroń and Wisła (Silesian Voivodeship, Poland) and Nýdek (Moravian-Silesian Region, Czech Republic). The mountain lies in the historical region of Cieszyn Silesia.

It is distinct for its steep slopes in the east and the west. Mostly coniferous trees grow on its slopes. It is the largest peak of the Czech part of the Silesian Beskids. There is a 29 m-high lookout tower on the mountain and mountain hut on the Czech side of the mountain.

History
The mountain hut was constructed in 1904 by the German tourist association Beskidenverein, and was named Erzherzogin Isabella Schutzhaus in honor of Archduchess Isabella of Austria. In 1920 the new border between the states of Poland and Czechoslovakia was established running across the mountain (thus creating Zaolzie region). After World War II and expropriation of German property, the hut was nationalized by the Czechoslovak government. A smaller mountain hut was built on the Polish side in 1962.

Tourism
In 1965–1967 a chairlift was constructed on the Polish side, it has been renovated several times since. Reaching the mountain via chairlift takes roughly 6 minutes. The mountain can be hiked from both sides of the border, though the Polish side offers easier access to the summit from Ustroń. The Knight's hiking trail from the Czech side runs through the municipality of Nýdek.

Gallery

References

External links

Silesian Beskids
Mountains of Poland
Mountains and hills of the Czech Republic
Czech Republic–Poland border
International mountains of Europe
Mountains under 1000 metres